Abdoulaye Samba Diallo (born 1946) is a Senegalese athlete. He competed in the men's triple jump at the 1980 Summer Olympics.

References

1946 births
Living people
Athletes (track and field) at the 1980 Summer Olympics
Senegalese male triple jumpers
Olympic athletes of Senegal
Place of birth missing (living people)